The Titipiti River is a tributary of Feuquières Lake, in Quebec, in Canada. This watercourse crosses the administrative regions of:
Saguenay-Lac-Saint-Jean: in the unorganized territory Lac-Ashuapmushuan, Quebec, in the Le Domaine-du-Roy Regional County Municipality (RCM);
Nord-du-Québec: in the municipality of Eeyou Istchee Baie-James (municipality), in Jamésie.

This river crosses successively the cantons of Ventadour and Feuquières. Forestry is the main economic activity of the sector; recreational tourism activities, second. A logging camp has been established on the west bank of Ventadour Lake near a forest road.

The southern part of the Titipiti River Valley is served by route 212 which connects Obedjiwan to La Tuque and passes south of Lake Dubois. From there, the forest road R1032 (North-South direction) passes on the west side of the Ventadour River. The forest road R0212 (East-West direction) near the head lake of Titipiti River.

The surface of the Titipiti River is usually frozen from early November to mid-May, however, safe ice movement is generally from mid-November to mid-April.

Geography

Toponymy 
At various times in history, this territory has been occupied by the Attikameks, the Algonquin and the Cree.

The toponym "Titipiti River" was officialized on December 5, 1968, at the Commission de toponymie du Québec, when it was created.

Notes and references

See also 

Rivers of Nord-du-Québec
Rivers of Saguenay–Lac-Saint-Jean
Nottaway River drainage basin